Maxime Teixeira (born 18 January 1989) is a French professional tennis player. He competes mainly on the ATP Challenger Tour and ITF Futures circuit, both in singles and doubles. He reached his highest ATP singles ranking of World No. 154 in March 2012, and his highest ATP doubles ranking of World No. 256 in July 2015.

He claimed his first Challenger singles title by winning the 2011 Open Prévadiès Saint–Brieuc in Saint-Brieuc, France. He won against Benoît Paire 6–3, 6–0. He qualified for his first Grand Slam tournament at the 2011 French Open, where he reached the second round before being defeated by third seed Roger Federer.

ATP Challenger and ITF Futures finals

Singles: 14 (5–9)

Doubles: 12 (8–4)

Performance timeline

Singles

References

External links
 
 

1989 births
Living people
French male tennis players
Sportspeople from La Rochelle
People from Montrouge
French people of Portuguese descent
Sportspeople from Hauts-de-Seine